Portraits is the debut release from English punk rock band Max Raptor. It was released on Naim Edge Records in April 2011.

Track listing

Personnel
 Wil Ray - Vocals
 JB Willcox - Guitar
 Tom Garrett - Bass
 Matt Stevenson - Drums

References

2011 debut albums
Max Raptor albums
Naim Edge Records albums
Albums produced by Dan Weller